India has submitted films for the Academy Award for Best International Feature Film (formerly Academy Award for Best Foreign Language Film) since 1957, a year after the incorporation of the category. The award is given annually by the United States Academy of Motion Picture Arts and Sciences to a feature-length motion picture produced outside the United States that contains primarily non-English dialogue. The "Best Foreign Language Film" category was not created until 1956; however, between 1947 and 1955, the academy presented a non-competitive Honorary Award for the best foreign language films released in the United States.

The Film Federation of India (FFI) appoints a committee to choose one film among those released that year to be submitted as India's official entry to the academy for a nomination for "Best Foreign Language Film" the following year. The chosen films, along with their English subtitles, are sent to the academy, where they are screened for the jury. The 1957 Hindi film Mother India was India's first submission. The film made it to the final shortlist and was nominated alongside four other films in the category. It came close to winning the Academy Award but lost to Nights of Cabiria by a single vote. Since 1984, India has not submitted a film on only one occasion; in 2003, the FFI controversially chose not make an entry as they felt no film would be in a position to compete with films from other nations. , only three Indian films—Mother India (1957), Salaam Bombay! (1988) and Lagaan (2001)—have been nominated for the award. In 2011, the jury of the 58th National Film Awards made a recommendation that the Best Film winners at the annual National Film Awards be chosen as the official entry. However, except for the 88th Academy Awards, none of the Best Film (National Film Awards) winning film was submitted by India over the years.

Submissions 
As of 2022, India has sent 55 films to the competition. 34 of the which were Hindi films (including five Hindustani films and one Urdu film), three of which received nominations. Ten Tamil films and three of each Malayalam and Marathi films were submitted. Two Bengali and Gujarati films and one film from each Assamese and Telugu languages have been submitted.

Bengali filmmaker Satyajit Ray has represented India three times in this competition, the most by any director. As actors Kamal Haasan and Raghubir Yadav have been part of seven films submitted for the consideration—more than any other performer. One of Haasan's directorial effort was also submitted. Aamir Khan has represented India four times as an actor, including once as a director and thrice as a producer; Lagaan (2001), which he produced and starred in, received a nomination.

See also 
List of Indian winners and nominees of the Academy Awards
List of Academy Award–winning foreign-language films
List of Academy Award winners and nominees for Best International Feature Film
List of countries by number of Academy Awards for Best International Feature Film
 National Film Award for Best Feature Film

Notes

References 
General

Specific

External links 
The Official Academy Awards Database
IMDb Academy Awards Page

India
Academy Award for Best Foreign Language Film, submissions for